The Crystal Palace is a skyscraper in Ljubljana, Slovenia, situated within the BTC City shopping centre in Nove Jarše district in the northwestern part of the city. Standing  and 20 storeys tall, it is currently the tallest building in Slovenia.

The building houses high end stores, a wellness centre, business offices, and a congress hall.

Construction 
Construction began with laying of the foundation stone on May 15, 2009. The building has a distinctive shape, with supporting columns jutting out until the second floor, after which it gradually tapers toward the top. The first part proved the most challenging during construction: it took almost a year to finish it, after which the building grew one storey each 8 days and reached the final height in September 2010.

Plans for the Crystal Palace were made by Slovene architects Brane Smole and Denis Simčič. The 54 million Euro investment is covered by companies BTC d.d. and Nuba d.o.o and managed by the company Skai center established by the two parent companies for this purpose. The owners still intend to build a helipad on the roof which was not a part of the finished building due to difficulties with Slovene air traffic regulations.

References

External links 
 

Jarše District
Skyscrapers in Ljubljana
Skyscraper office buildings